Silvaneh District is in Urmia County, West Azerbaijan province, Iran. At the 2006 National Census, its population was 52,752 in 9,140 households. The following census in 2011 counted 55,437 people in 12,365 households. At the latest census in 2016, the district had 60,368 inhabitants in 14,202 households.

References 

Urmia County

Districts of West Azerbaijan Province

Populated places in West Azerbaijan Province

Populated places in Urmia County